New Synagogue was a synagogue in Gleiwitz, Germany (today Gliwice, Poland). It was built in 1859–1861, designed by Salomon Lubowski and Louis Troplowitz. The synagogue was destroyed by Nazis during the Kristallnacht on 9–10 November 1938.

External links
  The Synagogue in Gliwice, at “Zikaron – Memory”: Association for the Jewish Heritage of Gliwice

Buildings and structures in Gliwice
Former Reform synagogues in Poland
Synagogues completed in 1861
New Synagogue, Gliwice
19th-century religious buildings and structures in Poland